Asterolamia perknasteri is a species of sea snail, a marine gastropod mollusk in the family Eulimidae. The species is one of three known species within the genus Asterophila; the other congeneric species are Asterophila japonica and Asterophila rathbunasteri.

Distribution
This marine species is mainly distributed near the Antarctic Circle and can be found within the Scotia Sea.

References

External links
 To World Register of Marine Species

Eulimidae
Gastropods described in 1994